The Pelya is a river in Perm Krai, Russia, a left tributary of the Uls, which in turn is a tributary of the Vishera. It flows into the Uls  from the larger river's mouth. The main tributary is the Rassokha (right).

References 

Rivers of Perm Krai